State Route 177 or SR 177 runs in a north–south direction from Superior, Arizona to Winkelman, Arizona.
It ends at two junctions, US 60 to the north and State Route 77 to the south.  The southern half of this road runs alongside the Gila River and the Copper Basin Railroad.

The road passes through or near the towns of Kelvin, Riverside, Kearny and Hayden.  This road passes by the copper mines in eastern Pinal County.

It is a spur road of Arizona State Route 77.

Route description
The southern terminus of SR 177 is located at an intersection with SR 77 in Winkelman.  The highway heads northwest from Winkelman, passing through Hayden.  From Hayden, SR 177 heads towards the west-northwest before curving towards the northwest as it approaches the city limits of Kearny.  It continues towards the northwest from Kearny passing near Kelvin and Sonora.  The highway continues heading northwest until it begins to near Superior, where it curves towards the north.  SR 177 reaches its northern terminus at an interchange with US 60 in Superior.

Junction list

References

177
1177
Transportation in Gila County, Arizona
Transportation in Pinal County, Arizona